Chionodes johnstoni is a moth in the family Gelechiidae. It is found in North America, where it has been recorded from California. The Global Lepidoptera Names Index has it as a synonym of Chionodes gilvomaculella.

References

Chionodes
Moths described in 1947
Moths of North America